Ciutești is a commune in Nisporeni District, Moldova.it is enaugh agricol. It is composed of two villages, Ciutești and Valea Nîrnovei.

References

Communes of Nisporeni District